The name Doris has been used for four tropical cyclones in the northwestern Pacific Ocean and one in the South-West Indian Ocean.

In the Western Pacific:

 Tropical Storm Doris (1945)
 Typhoon Doris (1950) (T1113, 16W)
 Typhoon Doris (1953) (T2216, 18W)
 Typhoon Doris (1958) (T1705, 07W)
 Typhoon Doris (1964) (T0429, 32W, Isang)
 Typhoon Doris (1969) (10W)
 Severe Tropical Storm Doris (1975)  (16W)

In the South-West Indian:
 Cyclone Doris (1961)

Set index articles on storms
Pacific typhoon set index articles